Operation Clean and Beautiful Nation, officially known as Operation Pyi Thaya in English, was a military operation conducted by the Tatmadaw (Myanmar Armed Forces) in northern Rakhine State, near Myanmar's border with Bangladesh. The operation took place between 1991 and 1992, under the military junta of the State Law and Order Restoration Council (SLORC), officially as a response to the military expansion of the Rohingya Solidarity Organisation (RSO).

Similar to Operation Nagamin (Operation Dragon King) in 1978, the government's official explanation for the operation was to expel so-called "foreigners" from the area, as well as capturing RSO insurgents. The resulting violence however, resulted in 200,000 to 250,000 civilians being displaced (most of whom fled to neighbouring Bangladesh) and failed to prevent further attacks by the RSO, which continued until the end of the 1990s.

In December 1991, Tatmadaw soldiers crossed the border and accidentally fired on a Bangladeshi military outpost, causing a brief strain in Bangladesh–Myanmar relations.

References

History of Myanmar
Internal conflict in Myanmar
Conflicts in 1991
1991 in Myanmar